The office of Mayor of Medway is the highest position in the unitary area of Medway, in Kent, England. The Office is currently held by Cllr Jan Aldous, who assumed the post on 5 May 2021.

Role
The Mayor is elected annually from among the councillors. The mayor presides over the meetings of the full council, is the first citizen of the district, and is the official representative of the Crown.

Within the borough of Medway, the Mayor of Medway takes precedence, as determined by the Local Government Act 1972, over all other people except royalty or the Lord Lieutenant of the County (if representing the Queen).

Medway unitary authority was created on 1 April 1998 when the City of Rochester-upon-Medway amalgamated with Gillingham Borough Council and part of Kent County Council to form Medway Council. The Mayor of Medway continues the Rochester City Council tradition of serving as Admiral of the River Medway, with jurisdiction between Hawkwood and Sheerness.

The mayor attends a number of Civic functions and public events throughout Medway and is also entitled to wear certain items of Civic regalia and the Medway Coat of Arms.

List of mayors of Medway

References

Mayor of Medway
 Medway